Contaco is together with Llesquehue River the two main rivers of San Juan de la Costa commune in southern Chile. It runs from east to west and discharges into the Pacific Ocean at the hamlet and beach of Contaco.

Contaco River
Rivers of Los Lagos Region